1975 Masters may refer to:
1975 Masters Tournament, golf
1975 Masters (snooker)
1975 Commercial Union Assurance Masters, tennis